Błękitny Wieżowiec (eng. Blue Skyscraper) is a building located at Bank Square in Warsaw. The building is located in the location previously occupied by Warsaw's largest synagogue, the Great Synagogue, which was destroyed by the Germans in 1943. Initial concepts for the construction of the skyscraper had been put forward in the 1950s, and construction began in the 1970s and was suspended shortly after the main structure was built. The unfinished construction was then often called the "golden tower" because of the colour of the facade.

The work resumed in the late 1960s and 1970s and was completed in 1981. The project was modified by a Belgrade-based company, replacing the copper-coloured facade with colourless reflective material, which gives a clear reflection of the sky (hence the current name, due to the building being blue during sunny weather). The skyscraper is 120 meters high and has 28 stories. Prominent former tenants include Peugeot and Sony. Both of these companies previously installed large signs on the building, which have been taken down since

See also
 List of tallest buildings in Poland

References

Skyscraper office buildings in Warsaw
Buildings and structures completed in 1981
Śródmieście, Warsaw
1981 establishments in Poland